The 2007 PBA Fiesta Conference Finals was the best-of-7 championship series of the 2007 PBA Fiesta Conference and the conclusion of the conference's playoffs. The series was a best-of-seven affair and was the 93rd championship disputed in the league.

Road to the finals

Series scoring summary

Game 1

Game 2

Game 3

The Phone Pals trailed by 23 points in the second quarter and then launched an amazing comeback for a 2-1 lead in the series. Mark Cardona, named best player of the conference earlier, and Felix Belano, once again hit the big baskets for Talk 'N Text, which went down, 20-43, midway in the second quarter and went ahead 75-74, midway in the fourth.

Game 4

Willie Miller, who before the game just become the seventh player in league history to win the Most Valuable Player (MVP) trophy more than once, scored 10 of his 29 points in the fourth quarter, eight in an 11-0 run that erased a seven-point deficit, down 73-80 with 3:57 to go, Miller took over and not only scored the points that mattered but dished out a brilliant assist to Sonny Thoss for a three-point play that capped the Alaska run and gave the Aces an 82-80 lead, 1:40 to go.

Game 5

Game 6

Willie Miller erupted for a career-high 37 points as he redeemed himself from his lackluster six-point showing in Game five. The season MVP starred in Alaska's amazing 22-0 romp in the second quarter that fuelled the Aces' charge after a sluggish start. The Phone Pals took the opening quarter at 34-22 but went scoreless in the first seven minutes of the second period. The Aces went ahead 44-34 after the fiery salvo presided over by Miller, John Ferriols and Rosell Ellis.

It was the largest run by any team in a PBA finals since Ginebra came through with a 30-0 attack against Shell in their 1991 First Conference title playoff. The Aces sustained the momentum up to the finish, with their backs against the wall, played with great resolve, leading by as many as 22 points at 98-76 with 11:08 left to play.

Game 7

Willie Miller came up with two big-time plays inside the final 1:17 as the Aces broke the game's last deadlock at 94 for a 98-94 lead which help Alaska cushion the impact of five missed free throws the rest of the way. The Phone Pals came within two and had a chance to tie the game in the dying seconds but JJ Sullinger was smothered by an Alaska defense that all but snuffed Talk 'N Text's hopes. After a split by Reynel Hugnatan, a last-second attempt by Sullinger from beyond the arc rimmed out.

Rosters

Broadcast notes
The Associated Broadcasting Company and DZSR Sports Radio broadcast the games nationwide.

Awards 
Best Player of the Conference: Mark Cardona (Talk 'N Text)
Best Import of the Conference: Rossel Ellis (Alaska)
Finals Most Valuable Player: Willie Miller (Alaska)

References

External links
PBA official website

2007
2006–07 PBA season
Alaska Aces (PBA) games
TNT Tropang Giga games
PBA Fiesta Conference Finals